Middle Sackville may refer to
Middle Sackville, Nova Scotia
Middle Sackville, New Brunswick